Croc O'Shirt was a line of apparel marketed by Mad Dog Productions, mocking the Lacoste shirts in the early 1980s. When Lacoste sued, the line was terminated. The lawsuit garnered publicity worldwide.

Croc O'Shirt was introduced in 1980. Sold primarily through mail order, the shirts were a hit with "anti-preppies." In 1983, Lacoste filed suit against the company claiming trademark infringement. The suit was eventually settled out of court, allowing Mad Dog Productions to sell the shirts for another year.

Mad Dog Productions went on to release other novelty items such as the Horse Shirt (a take-off on Polo shirts which attracted a similar lawsuit from Polo Ralph Lauren, Ltd.), the Silent Vigil Foam Rubber wind chimes, and Earl the Dead Cat.

The brand's name was a pun on the phrase "crock of shit" and its logo was a deceased Lacoste crocodile lying on its back.

References

Clothing brands
Novelty items